Philotheca sporadica, commonly known as Kogan waxflower, is a species of flowering plant in the family Rutaceae and is endemic to south-eastern Queensland. It is a shrub with small, narrow oval leaves with the narrower end toward the base and white flowers with a pink midrib, usually arranged singly on the ends of branchlets.

Description
The ten stamens are free from each other and hairy. Flowering occurs from August to November.

Taxonomy and naming
This philotheca was first formally described in 1942 by Michael J. Bayly who gave it the name Eriostemon sporadicus and published the description in the journal Australian Systematic Botany. In 1998, Paul Wilson changed the name to Philotheca sporadica in the journal Nuytsia.

Distribution and habitat
Philotheca sporadica grows in woodland and shrubland on shallow soil from near Kogan to Tara in the Darling Downs region of Queensland.

Conservation status
Philotheca sporadica is classified as "vulnerable" under the Australian Government Environment Protection and Biodiversity Conservation Act 1999 and as of "least concern" under the Queensland Government Nature Conservation Act 1992, but consideration is being given to delisting the species from the EPBC Act.

References

sporadica
Flora of Queensland
Sapindales of Australia
Plants described in 1994